6S may stand for:

6S (music), key signature of six sharps
6S (radiative transfer code), a computer program that simulates the reflection of solar radiation
6S / SsrS RNA, the first noncoding RNA to be sequenced
6S, a modification of the 5S methodology which includes "Safety" as the 6th S. It is a lean process improvement tool that stands for Sort, Set in Order (aka Straighten or Stabilize), Shine (aka Scrub or Sweep), Standardize, Sustain, Safety.
6S can be the shortened form of Six Sigma
iPhone 6S, a smartphone by Apple, Inc.
6S, the production code for the 1984 Doctor Who serial The Twin Dilemma

Transportation
Kato Airline, a Norwegian airline with an IATA airline designator of 6S from 1996 to 2008
Sahara Airlines (Algeria), an Algerian airline with an IATA airline designator of 6S from 1999 to 2003
British Rail Class 201 diesel-electric multiple units with 6 coaches and a short frame (6S)

See also
6 (disambiguation)
S4 (disambiguation)
 6X (disambiguation)